Mezzo is the Italian word for "half", "middle" or "medium". It may refer to:

Music
Mezzo-soprano or mezzo, a type of classical female singing voice whose range lies between the soprano and the contralto singing voices
Mezzo forte ("medium-loud") and mezzo piano ("medium-quiet"), musical terms for dynamics
Mezzo staccato, an articulation halfway between legato and staccato

Other uses
Mezzo (artist) (born 1960), a French cartoonist
Mezzo Buttress, a glacier in Antarctica
Mezzo DSA, a 2003 anime series, the sequel to the Mezzo Forte anime movie
Mezzo Forte, an anime movie
Mezzo Mix, a beverage sold by Coca-Cola in Germany, Finland and Austria
Mezzo TV, a television channel in France
Mezzo, a common name in the 19th century for the island of Lopud, Croatia

See also
 Mezzo soprano (disambiguation)
 Mezza, the feminine equivalent of Mezzo
 Mezzanine, an intermediate ("halfway") floor in a building
 Mezzoforte (band), an Icelandic band

Italian words and phrases